Kostelec nad Orlicí is a town in Rychnov nad Kněžnou District in the Hradec Králové Region of the Czech Republic. It has about 6,100 inhabitants.

Administrative parts
Villages of Koryta, Kostelecká Lhota and Kozodry are administrative parts of Kostelec nad Orlicí.

Etymology
The name Kostelec means "fortified church". In 1568, the attribute nad Orlicí ("upon the Orlice river") was added to distinguish it from other places with the same name.

Geography
It lies in the Orlice Table. The town is situated on the Divoká Orlice river.

History
The first written mention of Kostelec nad Orlicí is from 1316, when there was a fortified church. In 1341, it was referred to as a market town for the first time. Until the 17th century, it was part of the Potštejn estate and shared its destinies and owners. In 1454, the estate was bought by King George of Poděbrady, who gave the town its coat of arms. The next owners were the Pernštejn family, and from 1558, the Hrzán of Harasov family. During their rule, Kostelec na Orlicí acquired many privileges.

In 1629, the Potštejn estate was sold to the Belgian family of Gramb. Kašpar of Gramb bequeathed all his properties to the Jesuit college in Prague, but in 1667 Kostelec was acquired by Václav Záruba of Hustířany (the husband of Františka of Gramb), who won the court case. From 1746, Kostelec and Potštejn ceased to have the same owners. In 1796, Kostelec was bought by Josef Kinsky, and his family were the last owners of the town until it gained self-government.

Demographics

Sights

The principal landmark of the town is the New Kostelec nad Orlicí Castle. It was built in the Empire style in 1829–1833 for the Kinsky family. Following its return to the ownership of the Kinsky family in 1992, it was restored and opened to the public. The building houses the Kinsky Gallery and an exhibition of the history of the town. The castle complex includes a large park, which is protected as a nature reserve.

The Old Castle was originally a Renaissance fortress built before 1620 and reconstructed in 1668 and 1770. After the New Castle was built, it was transformed into a manor house and served the needs of officials.

Existence of the Church of Saint George is first documented in 1323. In 1769–1773, the Gothic church was replaced by the current late Baroque building.

Notable people
František Tůma (1704–1774), Baroque composer
Egon Ledeč (1889–1944), violinist and composer

Twin towns – sister cities

Kostelec nad Orlicí is twinned with:
 Bielawa, Poland
 Myjava, Slovakia
 Zeulenroda-Triebes, Germany

Gallery

References

External links

Official tourist portal
New Kostelec nad Orlicí Castle

Populated places in Rychnov nad Kněžnou District
Cities and towns in the Czech Republic